Six Bridges to Cross or 6 Bridges to Cross is a 1955 American film noir crime film directed by Joseph Pevney and starring Tony Curtis, George Nader and Julie Adams. Six Bridges to Cross is based upon the famous 1950 Great Brink's Robbery of Boston, Massachusetts in which the thieves made off with roughly $2.5 million.

Plot
Jerry Florea (Tony Curtis) is planning a heist. The story begins with the events which led a young Florea (Sal Mineo) to become a crook. One day he is shot during a robbery and as a result an amenable policeman and his wife take him under their wing. As a young man he deludes them, and pretends to no longer have criminal intent and even gets a job at the Brinks. They are unaware he is preparing to rob the establishment. It is only after he and his gang pull off the heist that Florea reconsiders his actions and attempts to make amends for the crime.

Cast
Tony Curtis as Jerry Florea
George Nader as Edward Gallagher
Julie Adams as Ellen Gallagher
Jay C. Flippen as Vincent Concannon
Sal Mineo as Jerry as a boy
Jan Merlin as Andy Norris
Richard Castle as Skids Radzevich
William Murphy as Red Flanagan
Kendall Clark as Mr. Sanborn
Don Keefer as Mr. Sherman
Harry Bartell as Father Bonelli
Tito Vuolo as Angie

Production
The screenplay for the film was written by Sydney Boehm, based on Joseph F. Dinneen's They Stole $25,000,000 – And Got Away with It. The film was shot on location in Boston.

Jeff Chandler was to play the lead but refused and was put on suspension by Universal.

A young Clint Eastwood auditioned for the film in May 1954 in his first real audition but was rejected by Pevney. The part of the young Florea was given to a 15-year-old Sal Mineo. Mineo had also successfully auditioned for a part in The Private War of Major Benson as a cadet colonel opposite Charlton Heston. Sammy Davis, Jr. was hired to sing the title track written by friend Jeff Chandler and Henry Mancini, recording it on December 2, 1954. The overall score was composed by Frank Skinner and Herman Stein but they went uncredited in the film for their contributions.

See also
List of American films of 1955

References

External links
 
 
 

1955 films
Film noir
1955 crime drama films
1950s crime thriller films
1950s heist films
American crime drama films
American crime thriller films
American heist films
Films directed by Joseph Pevney
Films shot in Massachusetts
Universal Pictures films
1950s English-language films
1950s American films
American black-and-white films